Cataracts is the third studio album by Levi the Poet, and he released the album on February 23, 2018.

Track listing

References

2018 albums
Levi the Poet albums